Events in the year 1756 in Norway.

Incumbents
Monarch: Frederick V

Events

Arts and literature

Births

4 September – Christen Pram, economist, civil servant, poet, novelist, playwright (died 1821).
3 October – Abraham Pihl, clergyman, astronomer and architect (died 1821).

Full date unknown
Anders Lysgaard, farmer and politician (died 1827).
Peter Andreas Heuch, merchant (died 1825).
Hilchen Sommerschild, first female teacher in Norway (died 1831).

Deaths
26 September – Joachim Andreas Stukenbrock,  at the Kongsberg Silver Mines (born 1699).

See also

References